Kandan Subdistrict is a subdistrict located in the southern side of  Fengtai District, Beijing, China. It shares border with Wulidian and Fengtai Subdistricts to the north, Xincun and Yuquanying Subdistricts to the east, Huaxiang Subdistrict to the southeast, and Wanping Subdistrict to the west.

This region was recorded in Wanshu Zaji as "Kandankou". The subdistrict itself was created in 2021.

Administrative Division 
In the year 2021, Kandan Subdistrict was made up of 19 subdivisions, of which 16 were communities and 3 were villages:

Gallery

See also 

 List of township-level divisions of Beijing

References 

Fengtai District
Subdistricts of Beijing